Vietri is the name of a number of places:

Italy

Vietri di Potenza, in the Province of Potenza, Basilicata
Vietri sul Mare, in the Province of Salerno, Campania

Vietnam
Việt Trì, the capital city of Phú Thọ Province